Matthew Allan Kemp (born 8 August 1980) is an Australian footballer who plays for Adelaide Raiders. Kemp announced his retirement from the A-League in May 2012. He made 79 appearances for Melbourne Victory, his last being against Greek giants Olympiacos.

Club career
Kemp was signed by the AIS in 1998 but transferred the next season to Adelaide City who were then part of the now defunct NSL. After playing a season there he was signed by Italian side SPAL 1907. The next season, he moved back to Australia where he returned to play for Adelaide City, before being signed by Adelaide United. He played for Adelaide in the A-League's first two seasons. It was announced on 11 April 2007 that he had signed a two-year contract with Melbourne Victory.

During his first season Kemp was much-maligned by the supporters, but soon proved his worth as a valuable defender.
He was the Victory's standout player during their 2008 Asian Champions League campaign where he benefited from his experience the year before in the same competition with Adelaide.
During the 09/10 Season Kemp has proved his worth to the Victory in attack as well as defence playing in wide and sometimes central midfield. He scored his first goal for the club in a match against the Central Coast Mariners in early 2010 and followed up with a goal coming off the bench against Wellington on Australia Day a few weeks later.

In the match against North Queensland Fury at Etihad Stadium on 5 February 2010, Kemp badly injured his knee when his leg buckled while challenging for the ball. Despite a valiant attempt to continue playing, Kemp succumbed to the pain and was stretchered off.

Matthew Kemp had announced his retirement from the A-League on 21 May 2012, aged just 31, stating that injuries were not a factor in his decision.

"I’d like to thank the club for those opportunities and wish them all the best in the future", Kemp said.

He said that he could have continued playing, but his decision was more based on the future. He felt it was time to look ahead and retrain in areas that would provide future professional opportunities and give him a chance to spend more time with his family. He also ruled out returning to his hometown of Canberra, choosing instead to play at West Adelaide SC.

International career
Kemp got his first senior international cap for the Socceroos on 7 January 2010 in an AFC Asian Cup qualifying match versus Kuwait at the Al Kuwait Sports Club Stadium in Kuwait City.

Honours
With Melbourne Victory:
  A-League Championship: 2008–2009
  A-League Premiership: 2008–2009
With Adelaide United:
  A-League Premiership: 2005–2006
Personal honours:
 Melbourne Victory Clubman of the Year: 2009–2010

References

External links
 Melbourne Victory profile
 Oz Football profile

1980 births
Living people
Sportspeople from Canberra
Soccer players from the Australian Capital Territory
Association football fullbacks
Australian soccer players
Australian expatriate soccer players
Adelaide City FC players
Croydon Kings players
S.P.A.L. players
Adelaide United FC players
Melbourne Victory FC players
A-League Men players
Expatriate footballers in Italy
National Soccer League (Australia) players
Australia international soccer players